Eriophora ravilla, the tropical orb weaver, is a species of orb weaver in the spider family Araneidae. It is found in a range from the United States to Brazil.

References

External links

 

Araneidae
Articles created by Qbugbot
Spiders described in 1844